The Parkdale Revolutionary Orchestra is a chamber-pop band located in Toronto that formed in 2005.

Truth in the Dark

Truth In The Dark is the first studio album by Canadian pop-alternative group The Parkdale Revolutionary Orchestra. The album was released in December 2007 physically, and was released to iTunes on January 4, 2008.

Reception
The album received positive reviews, praising lead singer Kristin Mueller-Heaslip's "fraught, full-throttle operatic vocals", and pianist Benjamin Mueller-Heaslip’s "unique and uncompromised" compositions and arrangements.

Track listing

The Torture Memos
The Torture Memos is the second studio album by Canadian pop-alternative group The Parkdale Revolutionary Orchestra. Unlike the band's first album, their sophomore record is written as a concept album, revolving around a series of documents produced by the United States’ Office of Legal Council between 2002 and 2005. The text in the lyrics is taken directly from these documents. The album was released to iTunes and CD Baby on December 1, 2009. The album in its entirety was first performed live at the Tranzac Club in Toronto, Ontario on June 6, 2009, and the video footage of the performance was released to the band's official YouTube channel. Additionally, a music video for the song 'Good Faith' was released. The video is a stop-motion animation film, and was shot by Benjamin Mueller-Heaslip.

Track listing

References

Musical groups from Toronto
Musical groups established in 2005
2005 establishments in Ontario